Nothing But the Truth is a 1914 comedy novel by the American writer Frederic S. Isham. It was adapted into a hit 1916 Broadway play of the same title.

Film adaptations
The first screen adaptation was the 1920 silent film Nothing But the Truth by Metro Pictures starring Taylor Holmes and Poppy Wyndham. In 1929 it was made into the sound film Nothing But the Truth directed by Victor Schertzinger and starring Richard Dix and Wynne Gibson. Several alternative language versions were produced by Paramount Pictures at their Joinville Studios in Paris including The Naked Truth (German) and The Pure Truth (Spanish). In 1941 the film was remade, directed by Elliott Nugent and featuring Bob Hope and Paulette Goddard.

References

Bibliography
 Bordman, Gerald. American Theatre: A Chronicle of Comedy and Drama 1914-1930. Oxford University Press, 1995.
 Goble, Alan. The Complete Index to Literary Sources in Film. Walter de Gruyter, 1999.
 Smith, Geoffrey D. American Fiction, 1901-1925: A Bibliography. Cambridge University Press, 1997.

1914 American novels
Novels by Frederic S. Isham
American comedy novels
Bobbs-Merrill Company books
American novels adapted into films